The qualification for UEFA Women's Euro 1995 was held between August 15, 1993 & October 30, 1994. The winner of the quarter-finals qualified.

First round

Group 1

Group 2

Group 3

Yugoslavia withdrew.

Group 4

Group 5

Group 6

Group 7

Group 8

Second round

First leg

Second leg

Germany won 5–0 on aggregate.

Norway won 7–3 on aggregate.

Sweden won 3–2 on aggregate.

England won 4–2 on aggregate.

Germany, Norway, Sweden and England qualified for the final tournament.
Germany, Norway, England, and Denmark qualified for the 1995 FIFA Women's World Cup. (Sweden qualified as hosts.)

External links
1993–95 UEFA Women's EURO at UEFA.com
Tables & results at RSSSF.com

UEFA Women's Championship qualification
UEFA
UEFA
UEFA Women's Euro 1995
1995 FIFA Women's World Cup qualification